Martine Etienne (born 22 June 1956) is a French politician from La France Insoumise. She was elected as the Member of Parliament for Meurthe-et-Moselle's 3rd constituency in the 2022 French legislative election.

References

See also 

 List of deputies of the 16th National Assembly of France

1956 births
Living people
21st-century French politicians
21st-century French women politicians
Deputies of the 16th National Assembly of the French Fifth Republic
La France Insoumise politicians
Women members of the National Assembly (France)
Members of Parliament for Meurthe-et-Moselle